Hari Raj Adhikari is a Nepalese Politician who served as the Member Of House Of Representatives (Nepal) elected from Gorkha-1, Province No. 4. He is member of the Nepal Communist Party.

References

Living people
Nepal MPs 2017–2022
Nepal Communist Party (NCP) politicians
Communist Party of Nepal (Maoist Centre) politicians
1967 births